Neal James Rackleff (born June 6, 1964) is a partner at law firm Locke Lord, where he focuses on economic development, affordable housing, and inner-city revitalization. He was Assistant Secretary of Housing and Urban Development for Community Planning and Development in the United States Department of Housing and Urban Development from October 2017  to November 2018. Rackleff previously served as director of the City of Houston's Housing and Community Development Department, where he oversaw the city's community development projects, strategic planning for affordable housing, and neighborhood revitalizations.

References

External links
 Biography at Locke Lord

1964 births
Living people
Brigham Young University alumni
USC Gould School of Law alumni
21st-century American lawyers
Trump administration personnel
United States Department of Housing and Urban Development officials